Bonnie Prince Charlie is a 1923 British silent historical film directed by Charles Calvert and starring Ivor Novello, Gladys Cooper, and Hugh Miller. It is now considered a lost film.

Premise
The film depicts the Jacobite Rebellion of 1745 and its aftermath when the Jacobite pretender Charles Edward Stuart evaded capture by the forces loyal to the Hanoverians, and escaped to the Continental Europe with the help of Flora MacDonald.

Cast
Ivor Novello as Prince Charles Stuart
Gladys Cooper as Flora MacDonald
A.B. Imeson as the Duke of Cumberland
Hugh Miller as Robert Fraser
Sydney Seaward as Neal McEachinn
Benson Kleve as Donald MacPherson
Adeline Hayden Coffin as Lady Clanronald
Arthur Wontner as Lord Kingsburgh
Nancy Price as Lady Kingsburgh
Lewis Gilbert as George II
A. Bromley Davenport as Sir John Cope 
Mollita Davies as Betty Burke
Robert Laing as MacDonald
Arthur McLaglen as MacKintosh

Production
While filming on location in the Scottish Highlands, Novello grew so fond of his kilt that he continued to wear it even when he was off set.

References

Bibliography
 Macnab, Geoffrey. Searching for Stars: Stardom and Screen Acting in British Cinenma. Cassell, 2000.
 Williams, Michael. Ivor Novello: Screen Idol. BFI, 2003.

External links

 Bonnie Prince Charlie at Silent Era
 Bonnie Prince Charlie at BFI Film & TV Database

1920s historical drama films
British black-and-white films
British silent feature films
British historical drama films
1923 films
Jacobite rising of 1745 films
Films directed by Charles Calvert
British biographical drama films
Films set in the 18th century
Films set in the 1740s
Films set in Scotland
Lost British films
Charles Edward Stuart
1920s biographical drama films
Lost drama films
1923 lost films
1920s English-language films
1920s British films
Silent historical drama films